Mark Peter Metcalf (born 25 September 1965) is a former professional footballer who played for Norwich City for 10 minutes.

Sources

Career information at ex-canaries.co.uk

1965 births
Norwich City F.C. players
Living people
English footballers
Footballers from Norwich
Place of birth missing (living people)
Association football midfielders